Allari may refer to:

Film
 Allari (film), a 2002 Telugu film
 Allari Mogudu, a 1992 Telugu film
 Allari Priyudu, a 1993 Telugu film
 Allari Premikudu, a 1994 Telugu film
 Allari Bullodu, a 2005 Telugu film
 Allari Pidugu, a 2005 Telugu film
 Allare Allari, a 2006 Telugu film

People
 Allari Naresh, a Telugu film actor